Kabale is a town in the Western Region of Uganda. It is the chief town of Kabale District, and the district headquarters are located there.

Sometimes nicknamed “Kastone” as in the local language Rukiga, a “kabale” is a small stone.

Location
Kabale is located in the Kabale District of the Kigezi sub-region. The coordinates of Kabale are: 01 15 00S, 29 59 24E (Latitude:-1.2500; 29.9900).

Population
In 1969, the national census that year enumerated 8,234 people in Kabale Town. According to the national census of 1980, that population had grown to 21,469. In 1991, the census hat year enumerated 29,246 inhabitants. In the 2002 national census, Kabale had 41,344 residents. The 2014 national census and household survey enumerated 49,186 people. In 2020, the Uganda Bureau of Statistics (UBOS) estimated the mid-year population if the town at 53,200. UBOS calculated that the population of Kabale Town, grew at an average rate of 1.36 percent, annually, between 2014 and 2020.

Points of interest
The other points of interest within the town limits or close to the edges of town include the following:

 headquarters of Kabale District Administration
 offices of Kabale City Council
 Kabale Regional Referral Hospital, a 250-bed public hospital administered by the Uganda Ministry of Health
 branch of the National Social Security Fund
 Kabale Currency Centre, a currency storage and processing facility owned and operated by the Bank of Uganda, Uganda's Central Bank
 Kabale University, a government university
 Kabale Airport, a civilian airport operated by Kabale Municipality
 Kabale Campus of Uganda Martyrs University
 Kabale Golf Course
 Rugarama Hospital 200 patient bed capacity Church of Uganda founded general Hospital
 Rushoroza Hospital - 200 Patients bed capacity, manageged by the Catholic Church
 Rushoroza Cathedral - seat of the Catholic diocese of Kabale, found in Kabale City 
Radio Maria Uganda - Kabale Station, located on Rushoroza Hill
 St Mary's College Rushoroza - Kabale, founded by the Catholic church
 St Paul's Seminary Rushoroza - founded by the Catholic church

Impressions of Kabale

Notable people
 Peter Mugarura - Economist and Development Economics Specialist
 Benon Fred Twinamasiko, Physicist, Makerere University
 Augustus Nuwagaba, Social worker and academic
Edith Mary Bataringaya, activist and politician
 Emmanuel Tumusiime-Mutebile - Governor Bank of Uganda
 Ruhakana Rugunda - Prime Minister of Republic of Uganda
 Callistus Rubaramira -  Bishop of the Roman Catholic Diocese of Kabale
 Ian Mugisha, Life coach, Marriage counselor.
 George Bagamuhunda - Bishop of the Church of Uganda Diocese of Kigezi
 Ezra Suruma - Economist & Academic
 Eli Nathan Bisamunyu - Politician and Historian

See also
 Uganda Christian University
 List of cities and towns in Uganda

References

External links

 Lake Bunyonyi & Kabale in Your Pocket - A free downloadable booklet about Lake Bunyonyi and Kabale
 Kabale Faces Shortage of Clean Water

 
Kabale District
Kigezi sub-region
Populated places in Western Region, Uganda